May refer to:

Albums
Flesh Tone, 2010 album by American recording artist Kelis
Bands
The Fleshtones, American garage rock band.
Films
Fleshtone, 1994 film.